Safiuddin Sarker Academy and College, also known as SSAC, is a renowned educational institution with two shifts, is located at Tongi, Gazipur Sadar Upazila, Gazipur District, Bangladesh. The schools under the institution offer five years primary education, five years high school education and two years education for tertiary level. The language of instruction is Bengali. In 2016, about 8,000 students are enrolled. There are about 170 teaching staffs including Assistant Professors to Junior Teachers.

History 
The school, founded by former Member of Parliament Hasan Uddin Sarkar, began as "Tongi Pauro Kindergarten" in 1978. In 1984 it was accredited by the Dhaka Education Board as a secondary school serving students through class 10. The first batch of students from the school sat their Secondary School Certificate (SSC) examinations in 1986. In 1994, the school opened a college section.

Campus 
SSAC is located on the west side of the Dhaka–Mymensingh Highway, in Tongi, Gazipur Sadar Upazila, Gazipur District.

Curriculum 
The national curriculum provided by NCTB is followed for all the existing classes and exams  under the Dhaka Education Board. Bangla and English are compulsory for all the faculties. This curriculum includes lower secondary, secondary and higher secondary school academic subjects. Following the government rules, ICT education has been obligatory for the students of secondary and higher secondary classes. They can choose one of the three major groups: Arts/Humanities, Business Studies, and Science.

Awards and recognition 
It has already been a tradition that every year SSAC secures the topmost positions in Primary Education Certificate (PEC) Exam, Junior School Certificate (JSC) Exam and Secondary School Certificate (SSC) Exam since last 10 years in Gazipur District. It was also recognised as one of the top 10 educational institutions under Dhaka Education Board in 2005–2006, 2006–2007 academic year. In 2011, SSAC was ranked 20th in performance among schools under Dhaka Education Board.

Photography Club of SSAC 

Safiuddin Sarker Academy & College has a Photography Club named Safiuddin Sarker Academy Photography Club - SSAPC. They started their journey on 14 July 2017 for the purpose of capturing memorable events of Safiuddin Sarker Academy & College, Tongi, Gazipur District. They want to represent their school & college around the country.

Information Technology Club of SSAC 
Safiuddin Sarker Academy & College has a IT Club named Safiuddin Sarker Academy & College Information Technology Club - SSACITC

Principals of SSAC

Md Hafiz Uddin Talukder (1978-2015) 
Md Hafiz Uddin Talukder is the first principal of Safiuddin Sarker Academy & College.

Md Shahidul Islam (2015)
Md Shahidul Islam.

Md Zafar Iqbal (2016-17) 
Md Zafar Iqbal.

Md Moniruzzaman (2017-Present)

Gallery

References

Tongi
Colleges in Gazipur District
High schools in Bangladesh
Education in Gazipur District
1978 establishments in Bangladesh